Aname atra, the black wishbone spider, is a mygalomorph spider of South Australia.  It is one of the wishbone spiders in the taxonomic family Anamidae, found in varied habitats throughout Australia, including Tasmania. The most common species are the mottled eastern wishbones in the genus Namea, found in rainforests, black wishbones in the genus Aname, found in drier parts of Queensland, and the bearded wishbone, Xamiatus magnificus, also found in Queensland.

Name
They are called wishbone spiders for the shape of their burrow.

References

External links
 Pictures and description
 Working draft for A field guide to Spiders of Australia by Robert Whyte and Dr Greg Anderson due to be published in 2014.

Anamidae
Spiders of Australia
Spiders described in 1913